The Senate Subcommittee on Veterans' Affairs (VEAC) is a subcommittee of the Standing Committee on National Security and Defence in the Senate of Canada.

Role
The subcommittee's mandate is to study the services and benefits provided to members and veterans of the Canadian Forces and the Royal Canadian Mounted Police, and the families of those members and veterans.

Members

References
 

Veterans